Vicki Maree Holland or Nelson (born 11 September 1962) is an Australian former competitive figure skater. She is a four-time Australian national champion (1980–1981 to 1983–1984) and competed at the 1984 Winter Olympics in Sarajevo.

Competitive highlights

References 

1962 births
Australian female single skaters
Figure skaters at the 1984 Winter Olympics
Living people
Olympic figure skaters of Australia
Figure skaters from Sydney